"Make It Rain" is a song by American rapper Fat Joe, released in 2006 as the first single from his seventh album Me, Myself & I. It features American rapper Lil Wayne, who only raps the chorus (but contributes a verse on the remix), and was produced by Scott Storch. The song peaked at number 13 on the US Billboard Hot 100.

It was nominated for a Best Rap Performance by a Duo or Group at the 50th Annual Grammy Awards. The Exclusive Def Jam Version, which does not feature Lil Wayne and instead has a hook by Fat Joe, is featured in the game Def Jam: Icon and is Fat Joe's fighting song.

Chart performance
Make It Rain debuted at number 55 on the US Billboard Hot 100 chart, on the week of November 18, 2006. After climbing the chart for 13 weeks, the song reached its peak at number 13 on the chart dated February 17, 2007. On May 15, 2007, the single was certified platinum by the Recording Industry Association of America (RIAA) for sales of over a million downloads in the United States.

Music video
DJ Khaled, Cool & Dre, Scott Storch, Birdman, Diddy, Rick Ross, Trina, Oliver Coats, Triple C, Hennessi, Emry L Moore and Young Money make cameo appearances in the video. Some of the scenes of the video pay homage to the late Big Pun's classic video "Still Not a Player". The video was directed by Chris Robinson and VinCock and produced by Nicole Acacio for production company Robot Films.

Remix
A remix was recorded in December 2006 and released as a single in 2007. It features American singer R. Kelly and American rappers T.I., Lil Wayne, Birdman, Rick Ross and Ace Mac, as well as uncredited vocals by DJ Khaled, and was produced by Scott Storch. There is also an official video for the remix. Sean Kingston has made his own version.

Music video
The video was directed by R. Malcolm Jones and features guest appearances by Fonzworth Bentley, Scott Storch, DJ Khaled and Trina.

Track listing
 Promo CD single
 "Make It Rain" (Remix) (Edited)
 "Make It Rain" (Remix) (Explicit)

 Digital Download single
 "Make It Rain" (Remix)

Charts

Weekly charts

Year-end charts

Certifications

References

2006 songs
2006 singles
Birdman (rapper) songs
Fat Joe songs
Lil Wayne songs
R. Kelly songs
Rick Ross songs
T.I. songs
Song recordings produced by Scott Storch
Songs written by Lil Wayne
Songs written by R. Kelly
Songs written by Scott Storch
Music videos directed by Chris Robinson (director)
Songs written by Fat Joe